Aslanbek Soltanovich Bulatsev (born in 1963 in Mikhaylovskoye, Prigorodny District, North Ossetian ASSR, Russian SFSR, Soviet Union) is an Ossetian politician and official. Bulatsev formerly worked as a tax chief in the Russian region of North Ossetia. On October 22, 2008, he was appointed Prime Minister of the Republic of South Ossetia by the South Ossetian parliament. Bulatsev was fired, according to the official decree, on health reasons, on 4 August 2009. He was replaced by Vadim Brovtsev, the head of a Russian construction company.

Cabinet
Bulatsev's cabinet at the time of its dismissal consisted of 19 ministers. The Head of Administration of the President is also included.

Source:  (source removed)

References

Living people
1963 births
Prime Ministers of South Ossetia
People from Prigorodny District, North Ossetia–Alania
Unity Party (South Ossetia) politicians